Mario Edgardo Durán Gavidia (born 3 April 1983, San Salvador) is a Salvadoran politician and businessman, has worked in the public administration since 2012, he was Minister of the Interior in the Cabinet of President Nayib Bukele, and since 1 May 2021 he is mayor of San Salvador.

In 2019, Mario Durán was selected by President Nayib Bukele, as Minister of the Interior and Territorial Development, in addition to being appointed President of the National Civil Protection Commission. As part of his administration, Mario Durán led the central government's response to the most serious environmental and health crises in the country, such as tropical storms, the Nejapa landslide and the COVID-19 emergency in El Salvador.

In 2020 Mario Durán made the decision to run as a pre-candidate for mayor for San Salvador, obtaining an absolute majority in the internal elections of Nuevas Ideas (NI).

On 28 February 2021, in the legislative elections, he became the winner of the Mayor's Office of San Salvador, defeating Ernesto Muyshondt, who was seeking re-election under the banner of the Nationalist Republican Alliance (ARENA). 

On 9 December 2022, he announced he would be seeking a second term as mayor of San Salvador in 2024.

References 

Mayors of San Salvador
1983 births
Living people
Nuevas Ideas politicians